Ryan Partridge (born May 17, 1988) is an American professional stock car racing driver. He last competed in the NASCAR K&N Pro Series West, driving the No. 9 Ford Fusion for Sunrise Ford Racing. He was the Whelen All-American Series champion in 2013 and 2014.

Racing career
His father was a track announcer, which led to his interest in racing. Partridge started racing Legends in 2004.

Partridge made his K&N Pro Series West debut at Havasu 95 Speedway in April 2012. In 2013 and 2014 he won the Whelen All-American Series. He was the Whelen All-American Series California champion in 2014.

In 2015 and 2016, Partridge competed full-time in the Pro Series West. He won his first series race at Colorado National Speedway during his first year, followed by three more victories in 2016. He finished second to Todd Gilliland in the 2016 championship.

After returning to finish second in points in 2018, Partridge transitioned to a role as a driver coach and spotter for the team's 2019 driver, Jagger Jones.

Personal life
Partridge was born in Rancho Cucamonga, California.

Motorsports career results

NASCAR 
(key) (Bold – Pole position awarded by qualifying time. Italics – Pole position earned by points standings or practice time. * – Most laps led.)

ARCA Menards Series West

 Season still in progress
 Ineligible for series points

References

External links
 

1988 births
People from Rancho Cucamonga, California
Living people
Sportspeople from San Bernardino County, California
Racing drivers from California
NASCAR drivers